Gresovščak (in older sources Greserščak) is a small dispersed settlement in the Slovene Hills in the Municipality of Ljutomer in northeastern Slovenia. The area traditionally belonged to the Styria region and is now included in the Mura Statistical Region.

There is a small Neo-Gothic chapel-shrine in the settlement. It was built in last quarter of the 19th century.

References

External links
Gresovščak on Geopedia

Populated places in the Municipality of Ljutomer